George Slefendorfas (born 7 January 1983) is a Papua New Guinean association footballer, who currently plays for Whittlesea Ranges FC in the National Premier Leagues Victoria 2. Besides Australia, he has played in Sweden and New Zealannd. He is of Lithuanian and Papua New Guinean heritage.

Career
Born in Papua New Guinea, Slefendorfas' family moved to Australia when he 8 years old, settling in the far North Queensland city of Cairns, Queensland. After playing for a few different clubs around Cairns, he moved to Sweden to play for then Swedish Division Three club Dalkurd FF. Before heading to Sweden, Slefendorfas helped the Rangers to an emphatic 8–0 victory over the Mareeba Bulls in the 2008 FNQ Division One Grand Final, scoring a hat trick.

Returning to Australia, Slefendorfas signed with Victorian Premier League club Heidelberg United in 2010, before moving on to the Victorian State League Division 1 club Sunshine George Cross FC in 2011.

After making some inquiries with Papua New Guinean legend Reggie Davani who he played alongside at Sunshine George Cross, Slefendorfas got in touch with Canterbury United coach Keith Braithwaite who signed him for the 2011–12 ASB Premiership season.

Slefendorfas made an excellent debut for Canterbury United against 2010–11 season wooden spooners YoungHeart Manawatu, scoring a brace in their 4–0 victory on the opening weekend of the season. Round 2 would provide more goals and excitement from him, as Canterbury United put Waikato FC to the sword 5–0, with Slefendorfas scoring 4 goals, to take his tally to 6 after only two games.

Honours
Far North Queensland Division One
 2008: Marlin Coast Rangers: Champions

References

External links
 

1983 births
Living people
Papua New Guinean footballers
Papua New Guinea international footballers
Papua New Guinean expatriate footballers
Papua New Guinean expatriate sportspeople in New Zealand
Papua New Guinean emigrants to Australia
Expatriate association footballers in New Zealand
Dalkurd FF players
Heidelberg United FC players
Caroline Springs George Cross FC players
Canterbury United players
Waitakere United players
WaiBOP United players
People from the National Capital District (Papua New Guinea)
Papua New Guinean people of Lithuanian descent
Association football forwards
New Zealand Football Championship players